Wyong is a town in the Central Coast of New South Wales, located approximately 63 km SSW of Newcastle and 89 km NNE of Sydney. Established in 1888, it is one of the two administrative centres for the  local government area.

History
Wyong is an indigenous word meaning either 'an edible yam' or 'place of running water'. William Cape was the first European settler to settle in the area and bring cattle and sheep into the district, on a  land grant bordering Jilliby Creek in 1825. Cape had two sons who also held land grants.

Historical sites 
 Alison Homestead, Cape Road, Wyong, built by Charles Alison, ; destroyed by arson 3 December 2011.
 Chapmans Store, Cnr Alison Road & Hely Street, Wyong, opened in 1901.
 Court House, Alison Road, Wyong, built in 1924. This building is built on the site of the first Post Office which opened in 1892.
 St Cecilia's Church, Byron Street, Wyong. Built in 1908, it is the oldest church in Wyong and is still in use today.
 Strathavon, Boyce Avenue, Wyong. Dates from 1912 to 1913, formerly known as Hakone.
 Turreted buildings, Cnr Church Street, Wyong. Built by Albert Hamlyn Warner, 1915.
 Wyong Public School, Alison Road, Wyong. Built in 1889 and last used as school in September 1979.
 Wyong Milk Factory, 141 Alison Road, Wyong, .

Wyong Plaza Work-In 
In May 1974, 67 BLF-affiliated construction workers at the shopping centre construction site responded to the dismissal of a labourer by announcing from the jib of the crane that they would remain there until the job was reopened for all workers. They practiced workers' control for 6 six weeks and only ended after the company agreed to generous allowances and conditions, including the right of workers to be consulted on "hire and fire" decisions.

Population
According to the 2016 census of Population, there were 4,326 people in Wyong.
 Aboriginal and Torres Strait Islander people made up 6.3% of the population. 
 73.9% of people were born in Australia. The next most common country of birth was England at 3.6%.   
 82.3% of people spoke only English at home. 
 The most common responses for religion were No Religion 27.2%, Anglican 22.3% and Catholic 22.3%.

Facilities
Wyong has an efficient and compact town centre, housing the Wyong Shire's Council Chambers, Village Central Wyong Shopping Centre, Hunter Institute of TAFE Wyong Campus, Wyong Police Station, Wyong Local Court House, The Art House Wyong Performing Arts and Conference Centre, and banks, government offices, local businesses and community services. Wyong Public School is located on Cutler Drive, north of the town centre. Wyong High School is west of the town centre on Alison Road.

Wyong is the hub of transport services in the northern part of the Central Coast Council local government area. Wyong railway station is served by NSW TrainLink services. Bus services are operated by Busways, Coastal Liner and Red Bus Services. The Pacific Highway passed through the town until bypassed in December 1983.

Wyong Racecourse is an important provincial track with weekly meetings. The town has extensive sport and leisure facilities.

Wyong Hospital is not located in the town, rather it is located 8.6 km North-East in Hamlyn Terrace.

See also
 Tuggerah Lake for a map of locations near Wyong.

Notable people
Notable people who are from or who have lived in Wyong include:
 Dale Buggins, motorcycle stunt rider
 Steve Carter, Australian rugby league player 
 Roy Ferguson, Australian rugby league player 
 Noel Miller, Australian cricketer
 Mark Skaife, race car driver

References

External links
 Darkinjung Local Aboriginal Land Council
 Central Coast Tourism
 Wyong Milk Factory
 Central Coast, Wyong Branch of National Seniors Australia

 
Suburbs of the Central Coast (New South Wales)
Towns in New South Wales